David J. Ley is a clinical psychologist and author, known for his critical stance regarding sex addiction. His first book, Insatiable Wives, won a Silver Medal in the Foreword Magazine Book of the Year in 2009.  A Publishers Weekly review said that his book The Myth of Sex Addiction "makes a thoughtful and persuasive argument, using case studies and ample references to the work of other psychologists to flesh out his case. While serving as an excellent resource on sex addiction, Ley's study also sheds light on the myriad cultural and sociological factors that influence relationships."

Education
Ley received his bachelor's degree from the University of Mississippi, and his masters' and doctorate degrees in clinical psychology from the University of New Mexico.

Views
In an interview with Salon.com, he said "The sex-addiction concept is a belief system, not a diagnosis; it’s not a medically supported concept. The science is abysmal."

Ley has also criticized Internet memes surrounding the No Nut November challenge, calling them "a creepy little smorgasbord of insecurity-driven hate with anti-Semitism, misogyny, and homophobia all rolled up in one."

References

External links
Interview with Anderson Cooper

Living people
University of New Mexico alumni
Year of birth missing (living people)
Place of birth missing (living people)
University of Mississippi alumni
American sexologists
People from Albuquerque, New Mexico
American clinical psychologists